Maran (also Romanized as Mārān; also known as Mara, Mareh, Mazra‘eh Mārūn, Mīrābād, and Morādābād) is a village in Manzariyeh Rural District, in the Central District of Shahreza County, Isfahan Province, Iran. At the 2006 census, its population was 50, in 19 families.

References 

Populated places in Shahreza County